Cred is sometimes used to refer to Credibility.

Cred or CRED may also refer to:

Cred (company), an Indian financial services company
Centre for Research on the Epidemiology of Disasters, at the University of Louvain, Belgium
Commission on Race and Ethnic Disparities, established in 2020 in the United Kingdom